Beygom Aqa (also Romanized as Beygom Āqā; also known as Bagom, Bagom Āqā, Begīm Āghā, Begīm Āqā, and Pa yi Mega) is a village in Karasf Rural District, in the Central District of Khodabandeh County, Zanjan Province, Iran. At the 2006 census, its population was 287, in 54 families.

References 

Populated places in Khodabandeh County